General elections are constitutionally mandated to be held in Guyana by 2025 to elect members of the National Assembly and the President of Guyana. The incumbent President is Mohamed Irfaan Ali, who was elected in the March 2020 elections. He is eligible to seek a second and final term, with the constitution limiting presidents to two terms.

Background
In the 2020 elections, the ruling APNU–AFC coalition was defeated by the PPP, although the election results were not finalised for four months due to attempts to rig the results in favour of the governing parties. The PPP gained one seat, giving it a majority of 33 seats in the 65-member National Assembly, while the APNU–AFC was reduced from 33 to 31 seats, with the remaining seat taken by an alliance of the Liberty and Justice Party, A New and United Guyana and The New Movement. As PPP got the most votes, its presidential candidate, Irfaan Ali won the presidency.

Electoral system
The 65 members of the National Assembly are elected using closed list proportional representation from a single nationwide 40-seat constituency and 10 sub-national constituencies with a total of 25 seats. Seats are allocated using the Hare quota.

The President is elected by a first-past-the-post double simultaneous vote system, whereby each list nominates a presidential candidate and the presidential election itself is won by the candidate of the list having a plurality.

Notes

References

Future elections in South America
2025